Kaliyodam is a 1965 Indian Malayalam-language film,  directed and produced by P. Subramaniam. The film stars Prem Nazir, Madhu, Rajalakshmi, Thikkurissy Sukumaran Nair and Babu Joseph. The film had musical score by G. Devarajan.

Cast
 Prem Nazir as Gopi 
 Madhu as Venu
 Thikkurissy Sukumaran Nair as Raman Nair
 Rajalakshmi
 Babu Joseph as Ramesh 
 Anandavally
 Jayanthi as Vasanthy
 Pankajavalli as Bhargaviyamma
 Ramachandran Nair
 S. P. Pillai as Kittu pilla 
 K. V. Shanthi as Radha
 Aranmula Ponnamma as Janaki
 Baby Vinodini

Soundtrack
The music was composed by G. Devarajan and the lyrics were written by O. N. V. Kurup.

References

External links
 

1965 films
1960s Malayalam-language films
Films directed by P. Subramaniam